Hashihito (? – 665) was Empress of Japan as the consort of Emperor Kōtoku.

She was Emperor Jomei and Empress Kōgyoku's daughter.

Notes

Japanese empresses
665 deaths
7th-century Japanese women
Japanese princesses